Pagalpanti is a 2018 Indian Gujarati-language comedy film directed by Jakee Patel featuring Rahul Dev, Mukul Dev, Ali AsgarPurva Rana and Bhavik Bhojak. The film was released on 1 Jun, 2018. Foram Mehta and Dinesh Lamba play supporting roles in the film.

Plot
This comedy-drama is about several people from different states who went for a tour where they met for the first occasion. Most of time they tend to quarrel with each other because of the differences between their states. Some of the husbands just ignore their wives and try to flirt with the wives of others, specially with the three foreign girls who have joined the tour. Thus the movie is a comedy, Gujarati language drama.

Cast
Rahul Dev as Kazaam 
Mukul Dev as Inspector Ram Sharma
Ali Asgar as Chhoti Goli
Bhavik Bhojak as Anthony Goli
Ashish Lal as Lakhan (Inspector Laxman Pandey)
Purva Rana as Roshni Tendulkar
Amanda Rosario as Jacqueline 
Sumit Sarkar as Sujoy Mukherjee

Dinesh Lamba as Harbhajan Singh
Sunil Vishrani as Kantibhai Shah
Jay Vijay Sachan as Rocky
Muni Jha as Vasudev
Hemant Jha as Prakash Rao
Sahil Kohli as Rishi
Amanda Rosario as Jaqueline
Jitu Mehta as Periaswamy
Sheetal Suvarna as Mrs. Preeto Harbhajan Singh
Sujata Thakkar as Mrs. Rupal Kantibhai Shah
Hemang Dave as Rustam
Nimesh Dilip Rai as Retd. Col. Ashok Tendulkar
Krupa Chandera as Mrs. Nandini Mukherjee
Foram Mehta as Mrs. Madhubala Swamy
Maulik Chauhan as Akbar Goli
Nirali Joshi as Basanti (Chhoti Goli Gang Member)
Hiren Khunt as Tom
Ravi Ratan as Karan
Hitarth Asija as Inspector's Son
Rohit Gida as Max
Abhilash Shah as Inspector Abhilash (Mumbai Police)
Vijay as Sharib
Satish Asija as Minister
Jimmy Asija as Senior Inspector
Aasnhi as Resort Receptionist-1
Luisa as Resort Receptionist-2
Shiv & Jash Dave as Kids at School
Aditya Sani
Abhay Goswami
Kalpesh Prajapati
Varun
Jaimin Panchal
Madhav
Omkar Gajjar
Manindar Singh
Alok Mani Mishra
Manish Balwani

References

External links

2018 films
Indian comedy films
Films shot in Mumbai
2010s Gujarati-language films